John Hines (February 20, 1850 – February 25, 1931) was an English Christian missionary, clergyman, and author who immigrated to Saskatchewan, Canada in 1874. He first settled in Green Lake then moved to Whitefish Lake, when he discovered that Green Lake was not suitable for an agricultural based settlement. Hines was sent to Saskatchewan by the Church Mission Society (CMS) to introduce Christianity and agriculture to the Indigenous populations.

Publications
 full text available online

References

1850 births
1931 deaths
Canadian Christian clergy
History of Saskatchewan
British emigrants to Canada